Wolves of the Night is a 1919 American silent drama film directed by J. Gordon Edwards and starring William Farnum, Louise Lovely, and Lamar Johnstone.

Cast
 William Farnum as Bruce Andrews 
 Louise Lovely as Isabel Hollins 
 Lamar Johnstone as Burton Mortimer 
 Charles Clary as Edmund Rawn 
 Al Fremont as Garson 
 G. Raymond Nye as Slade 
 Carrie Clark Ward as Mrs. Benson 
 Irene Rich as Juanita

References

Bibliography
 Solomon, Aubrey. The Fox Film Corporation, 1915-1935: A History and Filmography. McFarland, 2011.

External links

1919 films
1919 drama films
Silent American drama films
Films directed by J. Gordon Edwards
American silent feature films
1910s English-language films
Fox Film films
American black-and-white films
1910s American films